The Xiamen International Marathon is an annual marathon race held in January in the coastal city of Xiamen in Fujian province, People's Republic of China. It is one of the prominent marathon races of the year. More than 50,000 runners took part in the race in 2010. The 2013 edition featured 73,896 entrants.

History
The Xiamen International Marathon, which began in 2003 and is deemed by the IAAF as a Gold Label Road Race, is famous for its coastal scenic course. The entire course follows the scenic sections of the coastal city. The 2010 edition of the race had at least 30 instances of cheating, with some runners carrying multiple timing sensors or using public transport mid-course. Judges believed this was due to students attempting to gain bonus points for their National Higher Education Entrance Examinations.

Winners
Key:

Multiple wins

By country

Results

Men

Women

References

External links 
 
 Marathoninfo - Xiamen Marathon

Marathons in China
Recurring sporting events established in 2003
Sport in Xiamen
Winter events in China